Sowiniec may refer to the following places:
Sowiniec, Greater Poland Voivodeship (west-central Poland)
Sowiniec, Kuyavian-Pomeranian Voivodeship (north-central Poland)
Sowiniec, Lublin Voivodeship (east Poland)
Sowiniec, West Pomeranian Voivodeship (north-west Poland)